Marijuana, or marihuana, is a name for the cannabis plant and more specifically a drug preparation from it. "Marijuana" as a term varies in usage, definition and legal application around the world. Some jurisdictions define "marijuana" as the whole cannabis plant or any part of it, while others refer to "marijuana" as a portion of the cannabis plant that contains high levels of tetrahydrocannabinol (THC).  Some jurisdictions recognize "marijuana"  as a distinctive strain of cannabis, the other being hemp. For legal, research and statistical reference, "marijuana" generally refers to only the dried leaves and flowering tops (herbal cannabis), with by-products such as hashish or hash oil being uniquely defined and regulated. The form "marihuana" is first attested in Mexican Spanish; it then spread to other varieties of Spanish and to English, French, and other languages.

Etymology
The term, originally spelled variously as "marihuana", "mariguana", etc., originated in Mexican Spanish.

According to the Oxford English Dictionary, the term may come from the Nahuatl mallihuan, meaning "prisoner". Author Martin Booth notes that this etymology was popularized by Harry J. Anslinger in the 1930s, during his campaigns against the drug. However, linguist Jason D. Haugen finds no semantic basis for a connection to mallihuan, suggesting that the phonetic similarity may be "a case of accidental homophony". Cannabis is not known to have been present in the Americas before Spanish contact, making an indigenous word an unlikely source.

Other suggestions trace the possible origins of the word to Chinese ma ren hua (麻仁花, lit. 'hemp seed flower'), possibly itself originating as a loan from an earlier semitic root *mrj "hemp". The Semitic root is also found in the Spanish word mejorana and in English marjoram ('oregano'), which could be related to the word marihuana. This is also known in Mexico as "Chinese oregano".

Additionally, traditional association with the personal name María Juana ('Mary Jane') is probably a folk etymology. The original Mexican Spanish used forms with the letter  (marihuana), and is famously used in the Mexican Revolutionary era (1910-1920) version of the lyrics of La Cucaracha.  Forms using the letter  (marijuana) seem to be an innovation of English, and their later appearance in French and Spanish are probably due to English influence.

"The origin of the word “marijuana” foreshadowed its current use. Historically, the earliest and most numerous group of users in the Americas were slaves from western Central Africa (modern Gabon to Angola). Their words for cannabis are now used in nearly all the places they (involuntarily) ended up during the 1700s and 1800s, which includes West Africa, the Caribbean and South America. Most notably, in Central America, the Kimbundu (Angolan) word mariamba became the Spanish word marihuana." Hence, “mariamba” is where the word “marijuana” comes from. The word “marijuana” as we know it today didn't appear until 1846 in Farmacopea Mexicana, though it was spelled “mariguana.” In most following instances, the word was spelled marihuana.  In Chilean Spanish, mariguanza is the dance of a shaman in an altered state of consciousness.

English use

Early use of the term marijuana 

The word entered English usage in the late 19th century. According to the Oxford English Dictionary, the first known appearance of a form of the word in English is in Hubert Howe Bancroft's 1873 The Native Races of the Pacific States of North America. Other early variants include "mariguan" (1894), "marihuma" first recorded in 1905, "marihuano" in 1912, and "marahuana" in 1914. According to the second edition of Webster's New International Dictionary, the word originally denoted a species of South American wild tobacco, Nicotiana glauca.

The use of "marihuana" in American English increased dramatically in the 1930s, when it was preferred as an exotic-sounding alternative name during debates on the drug's use. It has been suggested that in the United States the word was promoted by opponents of the drug, who wanted to stigmatize it with a "foreign-sounding name". According to Lizzie Post, the word "marijuana" is deprecated because "in the early 1900s, the term marijuana was purposely used to negatively associate it with the Latino community." The word was codified into law and became part of common American English with the passing of the Marihuana Tax Act of 1937.

Contemporary pop culture and counterculture use 

From the portrayal in the media of marijuana use by the hippie subculture in the 1960s, the word became associated with revolutionary youth. By 1975, reggae artist Peter Tosh defended the use of marijuana in the song "Legalize It". Since then, the word has been associated with the stoner comedy genre, beginning in mainstream films in 1978 with Up In Smoke and other media including the New York Off-Broadway show The Marijuana-Logues.

Formal usage 
Many legal references prefer the term "cannabis", for instance in the Single Convention on Narcotic Drugs.  However, many laws and regulations often use the term "marihuana" or "marijuana",  for instance the Controlled Substances Act  in the United States. Cannabis reform  organizations, such as the National Organization for the Reform of Marijuana Laws and Marijuana Policy Project,  alongside political organizations like Help End Marijuana Prohibition Party of Australia and the Marijuana Party of Canada, also use this term.

See also

Cannabis (etymology)
List of names for cannabis

References

External links

The Mysterious Origins of the Word 'Marijuana', Alan Piper, Sino-Platonic Papers 153, 2005.

Cannabis
Cannabis culture
Etymologies
English words